Pedro Manuel Bergés Naval (1906–1978) was a Cuban footballer.

International career
He represented Cuba at the 1938 FIFA World Cup in France. In his three matches, Bergés did not score a goal.

References

External links
 

1906 births
1978 deaths
Association football midfielders
Cuban footballers
Cuba international footballers
1938 FIFA World Cup players